Yousef Saleh Erakat (born January 22, 1990), also known as FouseyTube or Fousey, is an American YouTuber who produces parodies, vlogs, comedy sketches and interviews. He also has two other channels, Fousey and DoseOfFousey.

Early life
Yousef Erakat was born in Fremont, California, to Palestinian parents. He has three older siblings, including Noura Erakat, who is a legal scholar. Erakat attended San Jose State University and majored in theatre arts. He moved to Los Angeles after graduating in 2013 to pursue his acting career.

YouTube career

2011–2014: Beginnings, fitness, and controversy 
Erakat has had multiple YouTube channels in the past, namely ones relating to fitness. It wasn't until he started making Middle Eastern videos that his popularity grew. His past channels included him following a workout routine, P90X, and giving a review and before and after of his journey. In 2012, Erakat was listed 3rd on the list of "40 Inspiring Muslims Under 40" by MBMuslima Magazine.  On January 1, 2015, Erakat released his first single "Prideland" under the stage name "fousey". A music video for the song was released the same day on his daily vlog channel DOSEofFOUSEY. Erakat was invited by Quest Nutrition to unveil their newest protein bar flavor by allowing him to prank other popular YouTube personalities, namely by pieing them in the face. The video has reached over a million views.

2015–2019: Rise to fame, July 15th event, and leaving YouTube 
On October 3, 2015, Erakat showcased his BMW 435 with a full transformation. Erakat took his car to West Coast Customs in hopes of drastically changing his car to represent not only his favorite colors, but his YouTube audience as well, which he used to call the "bruh bruhs". Erakat enjoyed the turnout and showcased it on both his daily vlog channel as well as his main channel fouseyTUBE. On October 6, 2015, it was announced that Erakat had signed with Creative Artists Agency, a popular agency located in Century City, Los Angeles. Erakat embarked on a five-day tour with friend and YouTube star Roman Atwood called the "Roman vs Fousey Tour" on February 24, 2016. They performed in five states along the west coast as a preview/test for their upcoming 30-day tour of the same name. On June 3, 2017, Erakat officially reached the YouTube milestone of 10 million subscribers, thus earning him a YouTube Diamond Play Button.

In July 2018, Erakat announced an event named "Hate Dies, Love Arrives". He claimed that the world will know about this event. On July 15, Erakat hosted the event, which turned out to be a major failure. Only about 1,500 people arrived at the place. During the event, Fousey suffered mental problems. When Fousey was on the stage, there was an alleged bomb at the event causing the event to be cancelled. Afterwards, Fousey announced the event changed his life, and further told that he lost his cars, his respect, his money, his worth and almost his parents’ house.

On August 31, 2018, Erakat retracted all of his material from his social media accounts. On February 26, 2019, Erakat posted a video on the reluctance to resume vlogging on the channel. In 2020, Erakat started to upload less and less on his channel and then later on eventually left uploading on the channel.

2021–present: Return to YouTube and expanding content 
In 2021, Erakat returned to YouTube with a new YouTube Boxing related channel named Fousey (stylized fousey). On this channel he has uploaded boxing related videos with Slim Albaher, AnEsonGib and other YouTubers. He started to call himself DanaTube. In the same year, he also returned to his DOSEofFousey channel. He told that he will use his DOSEofFousey channel for clips.

In January 2021, it was announced that he was going to release a book, titled Warning: This Is Not a Motivational Story.

Boxing career 

Erakat made his boxing debut against Slim Albaher on September 29, 2019, losing by a technical knockout. Erakat suffered a broken nose and needed two surgeries to fix it. Following that experience, he vowed never to fight again, but in 2022 he chose to step in the ring again against Deji Olatunji and lost, vowing to never fight again for the second time.

Personal life 
Erakat was brought up in a religious Muslim family from Palestine. He has on several occasions criticized negative stereotyping of Muslims.

Erakat struggles with ongoing depression, addiction, anxiety and bipolar disorder. He mentions it frequently in his daily vlogs, and also announced it on VH1.

He was nominated for Pranks and Show of The Year at the 5th Streamy Awards, and in September 2015, won the Show of The Year award.

Boxing record

Exhibition

Amateur

Filmography

Film

Web

Awards and nominations

Further reading
 Erakat, Y. S., with Martin Svensson and Leif Eriksson (Sept 28, 2021).  Warning: This is Not a Motivational Story.  Brentwood, Tennessee: Permuted Press. 
 The Guardian
 San Jose Mercury News
 BBC News
 The Times of Israel
 The National
 The Rise, Fall, and Re-Birth of Fousey: The Untold Truth (May 17, 2021). No Focks Given podcast (28).

References

External links

Re-Up Crew
gofousey website  (Archive incomplete)
 

American Muslims
American people of Palestinian descent
American YouTubers
Comedians from California
Fullscreen (company) people
Living people
Palestinian Muslims
Palestinian YouTubers
People from Fremont, California
People with bipolar disorder
Prank YouTubers
Streamy Award winners
YouTube vloggers
YouTube boxers
Erekat family
1990 births
San Jose State University alumni